Ave Pajo (born 9 July 1984) is an Estonian football player, who plays as a striker for Naiste Meistriliiga club Kalev Tallinn.

References

1984 births
Living people
Estonian women's footballers
Estonia women's international footballers
Sportspeople from Rakvere
Women's association football forwards
FC Levadia Tallinn (women) players